Timoti is a male first name, a Māori transliteration of Timothy as well as an Italian transliteration of Timoteo. It is also occasionally used as a surname. The name belongs to the following persons:

 Timoti Džon Bajford, a Serbian author